The Langenprozelten Pumped Storage Station is a pumped storage power station near Gemünden am Main at the Main in the under-Frankish district Main Spessart (Bavaria), which went in service in 1976. It uses two Francis turbines. 

The station produces traction current only and is an important peak load power station in the traction network for railways. 

The lower reservoir is fed by a creek, which is mostly dry in the summer. Both dams (of upper and lower reservoir) are rock fill embankment dams with an asphaltic concrete external sealing.

Coordinates are those of the lower reservoir.

Notes

Energy infrastructure completed in 1976
Hydroelectric power stations in Germany
Pumped-storage hydroelectric power stations in Germany